Lackthereof is the solo project of Danny Seim, a founding member of the Portland, Oregon-based band Menomena.

History
The first six Lackthereof albums were recorded at home and given out to Seim's friends on cassettes and CD-R's.  In 2005, FILMguerrero released Christian the Christian, making it the first album in the Lackthereof discography to receive any sort of formal distribution.

Seim took Lackthereof to a live setting for the first time in 2004, recruiting his then-wife Holly, friend Tyler Poage, and Kevin and Anita Robinson of the band Viva Voce.  This lineup played one show at Portland's annual PDX Pop Now! Festival before disbanding.

The following year, Seim revived the project again, this time with the help of Holly, Matt Dabrowiak, and Paul Alcott of the band Dat'r.

To support the 2008 release of Your Anchor, Lackthereof performed several more shows in Portland with Alcott, Dabrowiak, Jim Fairchild (of All Smiles, Grandaddy and Modest Mouse), and Jon Ragel (of Boy Eats Drum Machine).

On October 13, 2009, Barsuk released the 20-track anthology A Lackthereof Retrospective 1998–2008, or I was a Christian Emo Twentysomething.  The release compiles highlights from Seim's early home recording career, featuring songs that were never before released outside of cassettes and CD-R's given out to friends.

Discography

Albums
 Self Titled: L (1998).
 12 Songs for the Unstable (1999).
 In the Name of Protection (1999).
 Midnight Is Where the Day Begins (1999).
 Dulcet Little Love (2000).
 Malnutrition, Honey! (2002).
 Christian the Christian (2004).
 My Haunted (2008)
 Your Anchor (2008)
 A Lackthereof Retrospective 1998-2008 or I was a Christian Emo Twentysomething (2009)
  Building Personal Strength – a Single Song Album(Forgive Yourself) (2012)

Split EPs
 Boil the Ocean – split EP w/ Francis (1999).
 Scissors and Blue – split EP w/ Francis (2001).

Other notable collaborations
 Menomena
 Holcombe Waller
 All Smiles
 Ramona Falls
 Faux-Hoax
 Laura Gibson
 Pocket (musician)
 Dat'r
 Blue Like Jazz (film)
Pfarmers

References

External links
[ AllMusic – Lackthereof]

Indie rock musical groups from Oregon
Musical groups from Portland, Oregon
Barsuk Records artists